
Gmina Nowa Wieś Lęborska is a rural gmina (administrative district) in Lębork County, Pomeranian Voivodeship, in northern Poland.

Villages
Gmina Nowa Wieś Lęborska contains the villages and settlements of Bąkowo, Bąsewice, Brzezinki, Chocielewko, Czarnówko, Darżewo, Darżkowo, Dziechlino, Garczegorze, Jamy, Janisławiec, Janowice, Janowiczki, Kanin, Karlikowo Lęborskie, Kębłowo Nowowiejskie, Kozołęka, Krępa Kaszubska, Laska, Łebień, Lędziechowo, Leśnice, Łówcze, Lubowidz, Ługi, Małoszyce, Mosty, Niebędzino, Nisko, Nowa Wieś Lęborska, Obliwice, Piotrowo, Piskowa, Pogorszewo, Pogorzele, Pogorzelice, Redkowice, Rekowo Lęborskie, Rozgorze, Rybki, Rybnik, Tawęcino, Wilkowo Nowowiejskie, Wypichowo and Żelazkowo.

Neighbouring gminas
Gmina Nowa Wieś Lęborska is bordered by the town of Lębork and by the gminas of Cewice, Choczewo, Główczyce, Łęczyce, Potęgowo and Wicko.

References
Polish official population figures 2006

Nowa Wies Leborska
Lębork County